You Come and Go Like a Pop Song is an album by The Bicycle Thief, released in 1999 and re-released with a different track listing in 2001.

Songs on the album were predominantly written by frontman Bob Forrest (singer for LA band Thelonious Monster), though Josh Klinghoffer (later to play in Red Hot Chili Peppers and Dot Hacker) played a major role, contributing drums, guitars, keyboards, and songwriting. Forrest is briefly mentioned in Anthony Kiedis's autobiography "Scar Tissue".

Red Hot Chili Peppers guitarist John Frusciante appears on "Cereal Song", playing a lead guitar solo. Additional musicians, songwriters, and producers for the album include Josh Blum, Kevin Fitzgerald, and Marc Hunter.

The album's title may have come from a lyric in Ani DiFranco's song "Gratitude": "But I don't come and go like a pop song/that you can play incessantly and then forget when it's gone."

On July 21, 2020 it was announced via the Instagram page of The Bicycle Thief that the album is going to be reissued for a third time and for first time on vinyl with the inclusion of "Song for a Kevin Spacey Movie" and "Trust Fund Girl" as bonus tracks in a 7" yellow-vinyl. The album includes a digital-download card to get "Birthday Cake Rarities", a 24-tracks album of demos, live tracks, and two previously unreleased studio tracks. Its release date is set for September 21, 2020 – Which is the 21st anniversary of the album.

Track listing

1999 version
"Hurt" – 2:48
"Tennis Shoes" – 3:15
"Rainin' (4AM)" – 3:40
"Aspirations" – 4:25
"Max, Jill Called" – 3:07
"Off Street Parking" – 4:17
"L.A. Country Hometown Blues" – 4:30
"MacArthur Park Revisited" – 3:26
"Everyone Asks" – 4:41
"It's Alright" – 4:01
"Rhonda Meets the Birdman" – 0:17
"Cereal Song" – 4:29
"Boy at a Bus Stop" – 2:35

2001 version
For the 2001 re-release of the album, the track listing was completely changed, the tracks "It's Alright" and "Rhonda Meets the Birdman" were replaced with "Song for a Kevin Spacey Movie" and "Trust Fund Girl", and "Aspirations" was renamed to "Stoned".

"Song for a Kevin Spacey Movie" – 3:04
"Stoned" – 4:25 (called "Aspirations" on the album's first release)
"Max, Jill Called" – 3:07
"Tennis Shoes" – 3:15
"Off Street Parking" – 4:17
"L.A. Country Hometown Blues" – 4:30
"Hurt" – 2:48
"Rainin' (4AM)" – 3:40
"Everyone Asks" – 4:41
"Trust Fund Girl" – 4:13
"MacArthur Park Revisited" – 3:26
"Cereal Song" – 4:29
"Boy at a Bus Stop" – 2:35

Personnel

1999 version
Bob Forrest – vocals
Josh Klinghoffer – guitar, drums (tracks 2–4, 6–9), vocals (tracks 1, 4, 7–10), Rhodes piano (tracks 4, 6, 13), Wurlitzer electric piano (track 1), Dobro resonator guitar (track 7), organ (tracks 6, 9), lap steel guitar (track 11), cello (track 13), cello bass (track 7)
Josh Blum – bass (tracks 1–6, 8–10, 12), percussion (tracks 1–2, 4, 8–9), Wurlitzer electric piano (track 2), keyboard (track 13)
Kevin Fitzgerald – drums (tracks 1, 5, 10, 12)
Anna Waronker – vocals (tracks 3, 7)
Marc Hutner – guitar (track 4)
Nina – cello (track 9)
John Frusciante – guitar solo (track 12)

Singles
"Stoned" (called "Aspirations" on the album's first release) was released as a single in 2001 around the same time as the re-release of the album.

Stoned +2 track listing
"Stoned" (Radio Edit) – 3:13 (Bob Forrest, Josh Blum, Josh Klinghoffer, Marc Hutner)
"You Won't Be Missed" – 4:23 (Bob Forrest)
"It's Alright (Variations on an Oasis Theme)" – 3:59 (Bob Forrest, Josh Klinghoffer)

References

The Bicycle Thief (band) albums
2001 albums
Artemis Records albums
1999 albums